Donny is the seventh studio album by Donny Osmond, released in 1974. The album reached No. 57 on the Billboard Top LPs chart on March 1, 1975. Two singles, "Where Did All the Good Times Go" (No. 18 UK) and "I Have a Dream" (No. 50 US), were released from the album. The album was certified Silver in the U.K. on March 1, 1975.

Track listing

Certifications and sales

References

1974 albums
Donny Osmond albums
Albums produced by Mike Curb
Albums produced by Don Costa
MGM Records albums